The Words of Mormon is one of the books that make up the Book of Mormon. It is the only one of them which is not titled as a 'book' and consists of a single chapter of eighteen verses. According to the text, it is a comment inserted by the prophet Mormon while compiling the records which became the Book of Mormon.

Textually, Words of Mormon serves to link the Small Plates of Nephi, which precede it in our current printed version, but which would have been placed after Mormon's full record in the Golden plates, with the rest of the Book of Mormon.

Mormon explains that, while abridging the history of the Nephites, he came across the Small Plates of Nephi and chose to append them to the end of his finished work.  He then briefly summarises the reign of King Benjamin, the last king named in the Small Plates.

Mormon writes that King Benjamin stood against the Lamanites wielding the very sword of Laban which had been captured by Nephi after he killed Laban to obtain from him the brass plates that contained the Law of Moses. With his efforts, and wisdom, and the help of the prophets, King Benjamin established peace in the land.

Words of Mormon verses 12–18 have continuity with the first part of Mosiah, and some scholars have even suggested that it was originally part of a now missing portion of the Book of Mosiah. Others have suggested that Joseph Smith was inspired to write verses 12–18 as a summary/bridge back into the large plates, and that those verses are not contained in the Golden plates.

References

External links

 The Book of Mormon: The Words of Mormon

Mormon, Words